Paul-Eduard Luiga (15 May 1875 Vana-Kuuste Parish (now Kambja Parish), Kreis Dorpat – 15 November 1941 Sverdlovsk Oblast, Russia) was an Estonian politician. He was a member of II Riigikogu. He was a member of the Riigikogu since 10 March 1924. He replaced Victor Mutt.

References

1875 births
1941 deaths
People from Kambja Parish
People from Kreis Dorpat
Estonian People's Party politicians
Members of the Riigikogu, 1923–1926
Estonian people who died in Soviet detention